Isaac Foulkes (Llyfrbryf; 1836–1904) was a Welsh author and editor.

Life
Born at the farm of Cwrt, Llanfwrog, Denbighshire, he was the son of Peter Foulkes and his wife Frances. At the age of fifteen he was apprenticed to Isaac Clarke, a printer in Ruthin. In 1854 he went to Liverpool, before completing his apprenticeship.

He spent some years as a compositor in the Liverpool printing office of the Welsh language newspaper Yr Amserau, and later worked in the printing works of David Marples. In 1862 he set up his own printing business in Liverpool, which he ran for the rest of his life.

In May 1890 Foulkes began to issue Y Cymro (The Welshman), a weekly newspaper in Welsh intended primarily for Liverpool Welsh readers, but soon read widely in Wales as well; he was both editor and publisher, and made the journal a literary forum.

Foulkes married twice, firstly to Hannah Foulkes, by whom he had two sons and three daughters; and secondly to Sinah Owen.

Foulkes died at Rhewl, near Ruthin, on 2 November 1904, and was buried in Llanbedr churchyard.

Works
Foulkes, bardic name Llyfrbryf (Bookworm), was an author, critic, editor and publisher of Welsh-language literature. He wrote:

 Cymru Fu, folklore, pt. i. Llanidloes, 1862; pts. ii. and iii. Liverpool, 1863–4; 2nd edit. Wrexham, 1872.
 Rheinallt ap Gruffydd, novel, Liverpool, 1874.
 Y Ddau Efell, neu Llanllonydd, novel, 1875
 Memoir of the poet Ceiriog Liverpool, 1887; 2nd edit. 1902; 3rd edit. 1911.
 Memoir of the novelist, Daniel Owen, Liverpool, 1903.

He issued in 1877–88 Cyfres y Ceinion (The Gem Series), a series of reprints of Welsh classics which helped the Welsh literary revival. Works which he both edited and published are:

 Enwogion Cymru, a biographical dictionary of eminent Welshmen (Liverpool, 1870). 
 The Mabinogion, with a translation into modern Welsh (1880).
 The Poetry of Trebor Mai (1883). 
 Oriau Olaf, by Ceiriog (1888).

Editions of Dafydd ap Gwilym, the Iolo Manuscripts  and Philip Yorke's Royal Tribes of Wales were also issued by his press.

References

Sources cited

Reprinted 2016, Wentworth Press, 

1836 births
1904 deaths
Welsh writers
Welsh newspaper editors
British printers
19th-century British businesspeople